Simon Louis Adler (August 30, 1867 – May 23, 1934) was a United States district judge of the United States District Court for the Western District of New York.

Education and career

Born on August 30, 1867, in Seneca Falls, New York, Adler received a Bachelor of Laws from Cornell University in 1889, and graduated from Harvard Law School in 1892. He practiced law in Rochester, New York. Adler was a member of the New York State Assembly (Monroe Co., 2nd D.) in the 134th New York State Legislature through the 149th New York State Legislature, from 1911 to 1926, and was Chairman of the Committee on Banks in 1915, and Majority Leader from 1916 to 1926.

Federal judicial service

Adler received a recess appointment from President Calvin Coolidge on May 19, 1927, to the United States District Court for the Western District of New York, to a new seat authorized by 44 Stat. 1370. He was nominated to the same position by President Coolidge on December 6, 1927. He was confirmed by the United States Senate on January 16, 1928, and received his commission the same day. His service terminated on May 23, 1934, due to his death.

References

Sources
 

1867 births
1934 deaths
Cornell University alumni
Harvard Law School alumni
Members of the New York State Assembly
Judges of the United States District Court for the Western District of New York
United States district court judges appointed by Calvin Coolidge
20th-century American judges
People from Seneca Falls, New York
Lawyers from Rochester, New York